The Mary Seaman Ennis House, located at 202 W. 13th St. in Goodland, Kansas, is a historic Queen Anne style house that was built in 1907 and is listed on the National Register of Historic Places. The house was listed on the National Register in 2006. It was deemed significant as an "outstanding" example of Queen Anne architecture and for association with local builder Fred Hunt.

The house is now known as the Ennis-Handy House and is operated by the Sherman County Historical Society as a Victorian-period historic house museum.

References

External links 
Ennis-Handy House - Sherman County Historical Society
More photos of the Ennis-Handy House at Wikimedia Commons

Houses on the National Register of Historic Places in Kansas
Queen Anne architecture in Kansas
Houses completed in 1907
Houses in Sherman County, Kansas
Museums in Sherman County, Kansas
Historic house museums in Kansas
National Register of Historic Places in Sherman County, Kansas